Inca Huajanan or Inka Waqanan (Quechua inka Inca, waqay to cry, -na a suffix, "where the Inca cries",  -n a suffix, also spelled Inca Huajanan, Inca Huaccanan) is a mountain in the Andes of Peru which reaches a height of approximately . It is located in the Ancash Region, Ocros Province, Acas District. Inca Huajanan lies southwest of the archaeological site of Yanaque - Quilcamarca.

See also
 South America

References 

Mountains of Peru
Mountains of Ancash Region